Rhytidops is a genus of flies in the family Ropalomeridae. There are at least two described species in Rhytidops.

Species
These two species belong to the genus Rhytidops:
 Rhytidops chacoensis Lindner, 1930
 Rhytidops floridensis (Aldrich, 1932)

References

Further reading

 

Sciomyzoidea genera
Articles created by Qbugbot
Taxa named by Erwin Lindner